Eulim or ilm is a chemistry library written in Ruby under the MIT license. It supports the calculation of molecular mass of compound, balancing chemical equations, efficient handling of states of chemical species and many more things.

Example 
$ irb
irb(main):001:0> require 'eulim'
irb(main):002:0> Eulim::Chemistry::Reaction.new(equation: 'KMnO4 + HCl >> KCl + MnCl2 + H2O + Cl2').balanced_eqn
 => "2KMnO4 + 16HCl >> 2KCl + 2MnCl2 + 8H2O + 5Cl2"
 
irb(main):003:0> Eulim::Chemistry::Compound.new("CaCO3")
=> #<Eulim::Chemistry::Compound:0x00000002a65340 @formula="CaCO3", @constituents={"Ca"=>{:element=>#<Eulim::Chemistry::Element:0x00000002c805a8 @name="Calcium", @symbol="Ca", @atomic_number=20, @atomic_mass=#<Unitwise::Measurement value=40.078 unit=u>>, :atom_count=>1}, "C"=>{:element=>#<Eulim::Chemistry::Element:0x00000002c8f6e8 @name="Carbon", @symbol="C", @atomic_number=6, @atomic_mass=#<Unitwise::Measurement value=12.0107 unit=u>>, :atom_count=>1}, "O"=>{:element=>#<Eulim::Chemistry::Element:0x00000002c8dc30 @name="Oxygen", @symbol="O", @atomic_number=8, @atomic_mass=#<Unitwise::Measurement value=15.9996 unit=u>>, :atom_count=>3}}, @molecular_mass=#<Unitwise::Measurement value=100.0875 unit=u>>

irb(main):004:0> Eulim::Chemistry::Reaction.new(equation: '2Na(s) + 2HCl(aq) >> 2NaCl(aq) + H2(g)')
=> #<Eulim::Chemistry::Reaction:0x00000002ce22f8 @equation="2Na(s) + 2HCl(aq) >> 2NaCl(aq) + H2(g)", @species={:reactants=>{"Na"=>{:compound=>#<Eulim::Chemistry::Compound:0x00000002ce1d80 @formula="Na", @constituents={"Na"=>{:element=>#<Eulim::Chemistry::Element:0x00000002c88e10 @name="Sodium", @symbol="Na", @atomic_number=11, @atomic_mass=#<Unitwise::Measurement value=22.9897 unit=u>>, :atom_count=>1}}, @molecular_mass=#<Unitwise::Measurement value=22.9897 unit=u>>, :stoichiometry=>2, :state=>"solid"}, "HCl"=>{:compound=>#<Eulim::Chemistry::Compound:0x00000002cabdc0 @formula="HCl", @constituents={"H"=>{:element=>#<Eulim::Chemistry::Element:0x000000025e5ab8 @name="Hydrogen", @symbol="H", @atomic_number=1, @atomic_mass=#<Unitwise::Measurement value=1.0079 unit=u>>, :atom_count=>1}, "Cl"=>{:element=>#<Eulim::Chemistry::Element:0x00000002c82c90 @name="Chlorine", @symbol="Cl", @atomic_number=17, @atomic_mass=#<Unitwise::Measurement value=35.453 unit=u>>, :atom_count=>1}}, @molecular_mass=#<Unitwise::Measurement value=36.4609 unit=u>>, :stoichiometry=>2, :state=>"aqueous"}}, :products=>{"NaCl"=>{:compound=>#<Eulim::Chemistry::Compound:0x00000002c8cda8 @formula="NaCl", @constituents={"Na"=>{:element=>#<Eulim::Chemistry::Element:0x00000002c88e10 @name="Sodium", @symbol="Na", @atomic_number=11, @atomic_mass=#<Unitwise::Measurement value=22.9897 unit=u>>, :atom_count=>1}, "Cl"=>{:element=>#<Eulim::Chemistry::Element:0x00000002c82c90 @name="Chlorine", @symbol="Cl", @atomic_number=17, @atomic_mass=#<Unitwise::Measurement value=35.453 unit=u>>, :atom_count=>1}}, @molecular_mass=#<Unitwise::Measurement value=58.4427 unit=u>>, :stoichiometry=>2, :state=>"aqueous"},"H2"=>{:compound=>#<Eulim::Chemistry::Compound:0x00000002c6f938 @formula="H2", @constituents={"H"=>{:element=>#<Eulim::Chemistry::Element:0x000000025e5ab8 @name="Hydrogen", @symbol="H", @atomic_number=1, @atomic_mass=#<Unitwise::Measurement value=1.0079 unit=u>>, :atom_count=>2}}, @molecular_mass=#<Unitwise::Measurement value=2.0158 unit=u>>, :stoichiometry=>1, :state=>"gaseous"}}}, @is_valid=true, @is_balanced=true>

External links 
 Eulim source code
 RubyGems Page
 Documentation

References 

Computational chemistry software
Free computer libraries
Free software programmed in Ruby
Software using the MIT license